The 2017–18 Tanzanian Premier League is the 53rd season of top-tier football in Tanzania. The season started on 26 August 2017 and ended on 28 May 2018.

Final standings

See also
2017–18 Tanzania FA Cup

References

Tanzanian Premier League
Tanzanian Premier League
Tanzanian Premier League
Tanzania